Linda Johnsen (born 1954 in Chicago) is an author on yoga and other aspects of Hinduism. She earned a master's degree in Eastern Studies and did post-graduate work in Comparative Religions at the Graduate Theological Union in Berkeley. In addition she spent decades studying Eastern traditions with Shakta and Shaivite yogis in India and North America.

Bibliography
Johnsen's essays have appeared in numerous magazines including Yoga International,Yoga Journal, Yoga Plus, and Mountain Astrologer, as well as in many anthologies. Her books include:
Daughters of the Goddess: The Women Saints of India (1994)
The Living Goddess (1999)
Meditation is Boring? Putting Life in Your Spiritual Practice (2000)
The Complete Idiot's Guide to Hinduism (2002)
Alpha Teach Yourself Yoga (2003)
A Thousand Suns (2004)
Fearless Living: Yoga and Faith (editor, 2005)
Lost Masters: Sages of Ancient Greece (2006)
Kirtan! Chanting as a Spiritual Path (2007) with Maggie Jacobus
A Thousand Suns: Designing Your Future With Vedic Astrology

References

External links
 Year-Long Meditation Faculty & Guest Speakers, Himalayan Institute.
 Linda Johnsen on Amazon

1954 births
American Hindus
American non-fiction writers
Converts to Hinduism
Living people